Tetrastrum is a genus of green algae in the family Scenedesmaceae.

References

 
 

Sphaeropleales genera
Sphaeropleales